Takwin was a goal of certain Muslim alchemists, notably Jabir ibn Hayyan. In the alchemical context, takwin refers to the creation of synthetic life in the laboratory, up to and including human life. Whether Jabir meant this goal to be interpreted literally is unknown.

Jabir states in his Book of Stones (4:12) that "The purpose is to baffle and lead into error everyone except those whom God loves and provides for!" The Book of Stones was deliberately written in a highly esoteric code, so that only those who had been initiated into his alchemical school could understand them. It is therefore difficult at best for the modern reader to discern which aspects of Jabir's work are to be read as symbols (and what those symbols mean), and what is to be taken literally.

Kathleen Malone O'Connor writes:

See also
Golem
Homunculus
Abiogenesis
Tulpa

References 

Arabic words and phrases
Alchemy and chemistry in the medieval Islamic world